Matic Žitko (born 21 February 1990) is a football player from Slovenia.

References

External links
PrvaLiga profile 

1990 births
Living people
Slovenian footballers
Slovenia youth international footballers
Association football defenders
NK IB 1975 Ljubljana players
NK Ivančna Gorica players
NK Celje players
NK Rudar Velenje players
Olimpia Grudziądz players
Chojniczanka Chojnice players
Slovenian PrvaLiga players
I liga players
II liga players
Slovenian expatriate footballers
Slovenian expatriate sportspeople in Poland
Expatriate footballers in Poland